Natalie E. Brown is a career member of the Senior Foreign Service, class of Minister Counselor. In 2019, she was nominated to be the Ambassador to Uganda, and her nomination was confirmed on August 6, 2020. She arrived in Uganda the weekend of October 31, 2020 and presented her credentials on November 17, 2020. She previously served as the Chief of Mission and Chargé d'Affaires of the U.S. Embassy in Asmara, Eritrea from September 2016 to November 2019.

Brown earned a Bachelor of Science from the Georgetown University School of Foreign Service in 1988 and was awarded her Master of Science from the U.S. Marine Corps Command and Staff College in 1999.

Personal life
Brown speaks French and Arabic, and has studied Italian, German, Amharic, and Tigrinya.

See also
List of current ambassadors of the United States

References

External links
 Women in Foreign Policy interview

Living people
Walsh School of Foreign Service alumni
United States Foreign Service personnel
Ambassadors of the United States to Eritrea
African-American diplomats
American women ambassadors
Year of birth missing (living people)
Ambassadors of the United States to Uganda
21st-century American diplomats
21st-century American women
21st-century African-American women
21st-century African-American people
American women diplomats